Gerald Harman Walenn (19 November 1871 – 27 January 1942) was a British violinist and composer of classical music.

Walenn was born in London, England. His father, William Henry Walenn, was a scientist and worked for many years at the Patent Office in London. His mother, Skene Charlotte (née Barth) was musically trained but did not perform professionally. Nevertheless, her interest in music led to music professions of several of her children: Herbert Walenn was a cellist and professor at the Royal Academy of Music, Charles Walenn performed with the D'Oyly Carte Opera Company and J.C. Williamson, another brother was an organist, and Gerald and a sister were violinists. Two other children found their way into art professions.

Walenn began playing the violin at the age of 8 under Kate Chaplin and later studied under John Rutson. He continued his violin studies at the Royal Academy of Music under Prosper Sainton and after his death under Emile Sauret.

He made his concert debut at the age of 14 with the Ballade for violin and orchestra, Op.16a by Moritz Moszkowski in the St James's Hall. He later performed the Mendelssohn Violin Concerto at Osborne House in the presence of Queen Victoria. Walenn also made extensive concert tours throughout Great Britain, the United States and Canada.

In 1903 he formed the Walenn String Quartet with Herbert Kinze (violin), James Lockyer (viola), and his brother Herbert (cello). In later years the violist position was changed to Lionel Tertis. The quartet was disbanded in 1914 due to the beginning of World War I. The quartet gave many premieres, including the Suite for String Quartet in C major by Alexander Glazunov which was first performed in the Aeolian Hall on the 25th of June 1907. The composer attended both the rehearsals and the concert.

In 1917 Walenn moved to Australia to follow a call for the position of a violin teacher at the Elder Conservatorium at Adelaide. Seven years later, in 1924 he took the same position at the New South Wales State Conservatorium of Music in Sydney and founded there the Conservatorium String Quartet with Lionel Lawson (violin), Alfred Hill (viola) and Gladstone Bell (cello).

Walenn was made a Fellow of the Royal Academy of Music, (F.R.A.M.) in 1936.

He died in 1942 at the age of 70 in Sydney, "after a brief illness."

Compositions
 Feuille d'album, for violin and piano
 3 pieces for violin and piano
 Song of the desert
 Butterfly
 Romance & Allegro, for 2 violins, cello and piano
 Caprice for violin and orchestra
 Harlequinade for violin and piano or orchestra (1900)
 Quartet for 2 violins, cello and piano
 3 easy pieces, for violin and piano
 Old Lavender, for violin and piano

References

1871 births
1942 deaths
Australian classical composers
Australian classical violinists
British male violinists
Australian male classical composers
Australian music educators
British classical composers
British classical violinists
Alumni of the Royal Academy of Music
Fellows of the Royal Academy of Music
British expatriates in Australia
British male classical composers
British music educators
Male classical violinists